Pachybrachis hepaticus is a species of case-bearing leaf beetle in the family Chrysomelidae. It is found in Central America and North America.

Subspecies
These two subspecies belong to the species Pachybrachis hepaticus:
 Pachybrachis hepaticus hepaticus (F. E. Melsheimer, 1847) i c g
 Pachybrachis hepaticus heteroderus Fall, 1915 i c g
Data sources: i = ITIS, c = Catalogue of Life, g = GBIF, b = Bugguide.net

References

Further reading

 

hepaticus
Articles created by Qbugbot
Beetles described in 1847